Tabo, also known as Waia (Waya), is a Papuan language of Western Province, Papua New Guinea, just north of the Fly River delta. The language has also been known as Hiwi and Hibaradai.

Tabo means ‘word, mouth’ and is the name of the language, whereas Waia is the name of one of the ten villages where Tabo is spoken.

Classification
Tabo is not close to other languages. Evans (2018) classifies it as a language isolate. Usher (2020) includes it in the Trans-Fly family. Part of the uncertainty is because many of the attested words of Tabo are loans from Gogodala or Kiwai, reducing the number of native Tabo words that can be used for comparison and thus making classification difficult.

Demographics
In Gogodala Rural LLG, Western Province, Papua New Guinea, Tabo is spoken in:
Lower Aramia River: Alagi, Galu, Saiwase, and Waya villages
Bamu River: Alikinapi village
Lower Fly River: Kenedibi, Urio, and Wagumi-Sarau villages
Segero Creek: Segero village

It is spoken by 3,500 people mainly in the southern part Bamu Rural LLG of Western Province.

Phonology
The phonemic inventory of Tabo is given below.

Consonants b, d, ɡ, p, t, k, m, n, l, w, j, h, s
Vowels i, e, æ, a, o, u

Vocabulary
The following basic vocabulary words are from Reesink (1976) and Wurm (1973), as cited in the Trans-New Guinea database:

{| class="wikitable sortable"
! gloss !! Tabo
|-
| head || wato
|-
| hair || hinibó; hinibɔ
|-
| ear || galo
|-
| eye || ba ͥdi; baidi
|-
| nose || dopo; dɔ:pɔ
|-
| tooth || lalo; lolo
|-
| tongue || mɛlpila; merapira
|-
| leg || nato
|-
| louse || tamani
|-
| dog || gaha
|-
| bird || hola; hola:
|-
| egg || kikipo
|-
| blood || hawi; 
|-
| bone || goha; goha:
|-
| skin || tama
|-
| breast || nono
|-
| tree || ke'ha; kɛha
|-
| man || dubu; tubu
|-
| woman || kamena
|-
| sun || kadepa; kadɛpa
|-
| moon || manome; manomi
|-
| water || bea
|-
| fire || koe; kue:
|-
| stone || -nadi; naki
|-
| road, path || gabo
|-
| name || mahiro; mahiřo
|-
| eat || hɛna; nɛ:na
|-
| one || kapia
|-
| two || nete'ewa
|}

Further reading
Schlatter, Tim. 2003. Tabo language grammar sketch (Aramia River Dialect). Unpublished m.s.

References

External links
TransNewGuinea.org database

Trans-Fly–Bulaka River languages
Languages of Western Province (Papua New Guinea)
Language isolates of New Guinea
Trans-Fly languages